Michael Talbot (born 11 September 1958) is an English keyboardist. In a career spanning more than 40 years, Talbot is probably best known as co-founder of the Style Council. He has been a member of Dexys Midnight Runners, the Merton Parkas and the Bureau.

Career

Style Council 
In 1982, he started working with Paul Weller to form the Style Council, who released their first records in early 1983.
Since the break-up of the Style Council in March 1990, Talbot has continued to play with Weller on his solo material. He has also released albums with fellow former Style Council member Steve White, under the name Talbot/White. 

He has since begun playing alongside former Style Council bandmate White and former Ocean Colour Scene bass guitar player Damon Minchella, in the jazz/funk band the Players.

Other work and collaborations 
Talbot played with late-1970s mod revivalists the Merton Parkas, Dexys Midnight Runners and the Bureau and can be seen in The Bureau's music video for their song "Only for Sheep".

Talbot was a member of Dexys (formerly Dexys Midnight Runners) in 1980 and from 2003 to 2013. Talbot played keyboards in Galliano, on tour with Gene, and on the 1991 Young Disciples album Road to Freedom. Talbot toured the UK in 2009 with Candi Staton.

In 2014, Talbot worked with Wilko Johnson and Roger Daltrey on the collaborative studio album Going Back Home. He also worked with Daltrey and Pete Townshend on their 2014 single release "Be Lucky." and on Pete Williams' album Roughnecks Roustabouts (Basehart Recordings), released in March 2015.

References

Bibliography 

1958 births
Living people
English new wave musicians
English record producers
English rock keyboardists
English songwriters
People from Wimbledon, London
The Style Council members
Dexys Midnight Runners members
Sophisti-pop musicians
Mod revival musicians
Musicians from London
Boogie Box High members